Ronald Allan Richards (2 December 1927 – 11 October 2006) was an Australian rules footballer who played with Footscray in the Victorian Football League (VFL).

Notes 

Ron has three children; Heather, Stuart and Geoffrey eight grandchildren; Renee, Rhiannon, Jarrod, Wynton, Jesse, Elise, Oscar, Poppy and two great grandchildren; Tessa and Zander.

External links 

1927 births
2006 deaths
Australian rules footballers from Victoria (Australia)
Western Bulldogs players
Maryborough Football Club players